Rosa moyesii is a species of flowering plant in the rose family Rosaceae, native to western China . These are followed in autumn (fall) by prominent bottle-shaped rose-hips.

Rosa moyesii is cultivated as an ornamental shrub and has been used in rose breeding. The more compact hybrid cultivar R. moyesii 'Geranium', with brilliant orange-scarlet blooms, has gained the Royal Horticultural Society's Award of Garden Merit.

References

moyesii
Flora of China